Cabañas del Castillo is a municipality located in the province of Cáceres, Extremadura, Spain. According to the 2006 census (INE), the municipality has a population of 477 inhabitants.

Villages
 Solana de Cabañas
 Retamosa de Cabañas
 Roturas de Cabañas

References

Municipalities in the Province of Cáceres